Robert Rasmussen may refer to:

 Robert L. Rasmussen (born 1930), military artist
 Robert K. Rasmussen, dean of the Gould School of Law at the University of Southern California
 Robert A. Rasmussen Co-founder & CEO of Agile Six Applications, Inc.